Sok Kam is a tambon (subdistrict) of Seka District, in Bueng Kan Province, Thailand. In 2020 it had a total population of 6,304 people.

History
The subdistrict was created effective August 10, 1989 by splitting off 7 administrative villages from Ban Tong.

Administration

Central administration
The tambon is subdivided into 12 administrative villages (muban).

Local administration
The whole area of the subdistrict is covered by the subdistrict administrative organization (SAO) Sok Kam (องค์การบริหารส่วนตำบลโสกก่าม).

References

External links
Thaitambon.com on Sok Kam

Tambon of Bueng Kan province
Populated places in Bueng Kan province